Air Commodore Imtiaz Bhatti  (born 18 April 1933) in Gujrat, British India, is a cyclist and a former Air Force pilot of Pakistan. He was the Pakistan cycling champion during his student days at Punjab Agriculture College, Lyallpur (now University of Agriculture, Faisalabad) in late 1940s and early 1950s. He set national cycling records and represented Pakistan in the individual and team road race events at the 1952 Summer Olympics where he was placed 1st among the Asian cyclists and 25th in the world in the 1000 m time trial. Bhatti a veteran of the Indo-Pakistani War of 1965 flew 34 combat missions, the maximum from Pakistan during the war and is credited with confirmed downing of two Indian planes and damaging a third, besides participating in raids that took out the Amritsar radar and various other air defence and ground support missions.

Career

Service with the Air Force 
After completing his postgraduate studies at Punjab Agriculture College, he joined the Pakistan Air Force in 1953, where he was commissioned as an officer and had a distinguished career before retiring as an air commodore in 1988. Due to his distinguished acts of gallantry, valor and courage shown during war while performing duty and meritorious service, he was awarded with Sitara-e-Jurat, Sitara-e-Imtiaz (Military) and Sitara-e-Basalat by the Government of Pakistan and declared a legend by the PAF Falcons and is one of the war heroes to whom tribute is paid on Pakistan Defence Day.

1965 war 

On 1 September 1965, Sargodha Airbase was assigned an Air Defence Alert mission. Bhatti who was a flight lieutenant in No. 15 Squadron at Sargodha at that time. After completing his regular duty 0400–1200 hours, he asked to be allowed to continue for another shift. Squadron Leader Sarfaraz Rafique commander of No. 5 Squadron, accompanied him on the mission, which started around 1700 hours.
On getting airborne, they were directed by the Pakistani radar at Sakesar to the Sialkot-Chamb axis, from where they vectored to Chamb-Jaurian. Once there, the two started visual search not only for the attacking aircraft, but also for the PAF C-in-C, who was reported to be making an on-site assessment of the battle in a T-37. Bhatti first spotted two Vampires crossing 3–4,000 ft underneath and informed S/L Rafique, who immediately went after the two spotted planes. Bhatti, instead of flying as a traditional wingman, broke away and sighted more Indian aircraft. Before he could go after them, he saw two more Vampires that were trying to get into position behind Rafique. He called Rafique to break and himself took care of the other two that were following Rafique.

According to the Government of Pakistan citation: "Flight Lieutenant Imtiaz Ahmad Bhatti was one of the two pilots who were on an air patrol when they were directed to intercept enemy aircraft attacking our ground forces in Chamb area. This was the first air encounter of the Indo-Pakistan War. Though heavily outnumbered, Flight Lieutenant Bhatti fought with exceptional courage and professional skill and shot down two Vampire aircraft in this engagement. This set an inspiring example for others to emulate. For his gallantry, determination and dedication to the Service he is awarded Sitara-i-Jur'at".

On 13 September, in an encounter between PAF F-86 Sabres from Sargodha and IAF Gnats from No. 2 Squadron, an Indian Gnat flown by Flt. Lt. A.N. Kale was shot down by Flt. Lt. Yusaf Ali Khan, although Kale managed to eject safely. The other Gnat, flown by Squadron Leader N. K. Malik, was engaged and damaged in air combat by Flt. Lt. Bhatti. The experienced Malik somehow managed to return to his base, but according to All India Radio the Gnat's pilot later died of wounds sustained during the combat while attempting to land. His funeral was attended by the Indian President. Yusaf Ali Khan was credited with a kill, while Bhatti was only credited with damaging a Gnat, despite later confirmation that Malik had died of his wounds and his Gnat had crashed.

1971 War 
After Bhatti was promoted  to the rank of squadron leader, he commanded the No. 25 Squadron from 1968 to 1970 flying Shenyang FT-6s fighter/trainer jets. When war broke out in 1971, he kept serving with his Squadron while stationed at Sargodha Airbase.

Later Years 
After the war, Bhatti was given the command of the No. 19 Squadron of PAF, he led the squadron from 1973 to 1974.

Service with the Ministry of Foreign Affairs 

After leaving PAF, he served as Ambassador / High Commissioner of Pakistan for Burundi, Madagascar, Malawi and Tanzania from 1990 until 1992.

Post Retirement Life 
After returning from his ambassadorial duty, he happily settled in Sargodha, looking after family farmlands in the districts of Jhang and Sargodha concentrating on growing citrus and guava orchards, bamboo and forest plantations besides various food crops.

Awards and decorations

Sitara-e-Jurat Citation 

For his actions in the 1965 war, Bhatti was awarded the Sitara-e-Jurat, which is the third highest gallantry award of Pakistan.

References

External links
1965 first Air combat - a thrilling dog fight
PAF September account
Flying Start PAF opens its account in 1965
Rafiqui opens September account
Sqdn Ldr Sarfraz Ahmed Rafiqui 
Tank Busting In The Chamb by Air Marshal Trilochan Singh PVSM AVSM VrC VM (Retd)
Air Attack - Outbreak of the WAR (Sept 1st - 6th)

1933 births
Living people
Pakistani male cyclists
Olympic cyclists of Pakistan
Cyclists at the 1952 Summer Olympics
Pakistan Air Force officers
Pakistani aviators
Pakistani military personnel of the Indo-Pakistani War of 1971
Pilots of the Indo-Pakistani War of 1965
Recipients of Sitara-e-Jurat
Recipients of Sitara-i-Imtiaz
Cyclists from Punjab, Pakistan
Sportspeople from Jhang
Ambassadors of Pakistan to Burundi
Ambassadors of Pakistan to Madagascar
High Commissioners of Pakistan to Malawi
High Commissioners of Pakistan to Tanzania
University of Agriculture, Faisalabad alumni